Doin' Their Bit is a 1942 Our Gang short comedy film directed by Herbert Glazer. This was the first short with Herbert Glazer as Our Gang'''s regular director. It was the 207th Our Gang'' short (208th episode, 119th talking short, 120th talking episode, and 39th MGM produced episode) that was released.

Plot
Hoping to entertain the military troops stationed in Greenpoint, Mr. Wills organizes the gang into a junior USO troupe. In addition to performing a "boot camp" sketch, the gang participates in a brace of production numbers.

Cast

The Gang
 Billy Laughlin as Froggy
 Janet Burston as Janet
 Mickey Gubitosi as Mickey
 George McFarland as Spanky
 Billie Thomas as Buckwheat

Additional cast
 Beverly Hudson as Miss Liberty
 Walter Wills as Mr. Wills
 Freddie Chapman as Messenger boy / Union of South Africa
 Vincent Graeff as Taxi driver / Poland
 Edward Soo Hoo as China
 Valerie Lee as Luxembourg
 Lawrence Long, Jr. as Milkman / Uruguay
 Freddie Walburn as Free France

See also
 Our Gang filmography

References

External links

1942 films
American black-and-white films
Films directed by Herbert Glazer
Metro-Goldwyn-Mayer short films
1942 comedy films
Our Gang films
1942 short films
1940s American films